Fairy King (1982–1999) was an American-bred Thoroughbred racehorse and a successful sire.

Background
A full brother to Sadler's Wells, he was bred and raced by Robert Sangster and associates. Out of the mare Fairy Bridge, he was sired by Northern Dancer who is regarded as the 20th century’s best sire of sires.

Racing career
Fairy King made only one racing start and broke down with damage to a bone in his foot.

Stud record
Retired to stud duty at the Coolmore Stud breeding operation in Ireland, Fairy King most often sired specialist milers. Initially he carried a low stud fee but success from his first crops led to him quickly being much in demand. He stood in Ireland throughout his career and was shuttled to Australia in 1992 and again in 1996.

Fairy King sired 395 race winners, including 73 stakes race winners. Among his notable offspring were:
 Pharaoh's Delight (1987) - won Phoenix Stakes
 Shinko King (b. 1991) - multiple stakes winner in Japan including the Group 1 Takamatsunomiyahai
 Turtle Island (b. 1991) - won Group One Phoenix Stakes and Irish 2000 Guineas
 Encosta De Lago (b. 1993) - won the 1996 Australian Group One Vic Health Cup against older horses,  Leading sire in Australia (2008, 2009) 
 Helissio (b. 1993) - won Prix de l'Arc de Triomphe, 1996 European Horse of the Year
 Second Empire (b. 1995) - won Group 1 Grand Criterium
 Princely Heir (b. 1995) - won Phoenix Stakes
 Victory Note (b. 1995) - won Poule d'Essai des Poulains
 Oath (b. 1996) - won 1999 Epsom Derby
 Falbrav (b. 1998) - 2003 European Champion Older Horse, careering earnings of £3,837,108
 Beckett (b. 1998) - won Irish Group 1 National Stakes

Suffering from laminitis, Fairy King was euthanized at Coolmore Stud on June 5, 1999.

Pedigree

References 
 Fairy King's pedigree
 March 10, 2008 article in The Australian titled "Kings rule at Flemington"

1982 racehorse births
1999 racehorse deaths
Racehorses bred in Kentucky
Racehorses trained in Ireland
Champion Thoroughbred Sires of France
Thoroughbred family 5-h